Andritz ( – "fast-flowing water") is the 12th district of Graz. It is located in the extreme north of the city.
It had a population of 18,339 in 2011 and covers an area of 18.47 square kilometres. The postal codes of Andritz are 8010, 8042-8046 and 8054.

History
The name Andritz was first mentioned in 1265.

Andritz's most important industry, the technology company Andritz AG, was established by Josef Körösi in 1852. The largest of its endeavors, a pulp mill, was bought by them in 1913 but which had been in existence since 1790. The company as of 2009 has 13,176 employees.

Andritz was a separate municipality until 1938, when it merged with the southern part of Weinitzen and joined Graz. The current district boundaries were set in 1946.

Points of interest

 Church St. Veit
 Chateau St. Gotthard
 Chapel of St. Ulrich

Economy
 Andritz AG (former "Maschinenfabrik Andritz")

References

External links
 Homepage of Graz-Andritz

Districts of Graz
Graz Highlands